Woodruff Creek is a small river in San Mateo County, California and is a tributary to La Honda Creek, which in turn is tributary to San Gregorio Creek.

References

See also
List of watercourses in the San Francisco Bay Area

Rivers of San Mateo County, California
Rivers of Northern California